Occupational therapy (OT) is a healthcare profession. It involves the use of assessment and intervention to develop, recover, or maintain the meaningful activities, or occupations, of individuals, groups, or communities. The field of OT consists of health care practitioners trained and educated to improve mental and physical performance. Occupational therapists specialize in teaching, educating, and supporting participation in any activity that occupies an individual's time. It is an independent health profession sometimes categorized as an allied health profession and consists of occupational therapists (OTs) and occupational therapy assistants (OTAs). While OTs and OTAs have different roles, they both work with people who want to improve their mental and or physical health, disabilities, injuries, or impairments.

The American Occupational Therapy Association defines an occupational therapist as someone who "helps people across their lifespan participate in the things they want and/or need to do through the therapeutic use of everyday activities (occupations)". Definitions by professional occupational therapy organizations outside North America are similar in content.

Common interventions include:
 Helping children with disabilities to participate in school and social situations (independent mobility is often a central concern)
 Training in assistive device technology, meaningful and purposeful activities, and life skills.
 Physical injury rehabilitation
 Mental dysfunction rehabilitation 
 Support of individuals across the age spectrum experiencing physical and cognitive changes
 Assessing ergonomics and assistive seating options to maximize independent function, while alleviating the risk of pressure injury
 Education in the disease and rehabilitation process  
 Advocating for patient health

Typically, occupational therapists are university-educated professionals and must pass a licensing exam to practice. Currently, entry level occupational therapists must have a masters degree while certified occupational therapy assistants require a two year associates degree to practice in the United States. Individuals must pass a national board certification and apply for a state license in most states. Occupational therapists often work closely with professionals in physical therapy, speech–language pathology, audiology, nursing, nutrition, social work, psychology, medicine, and assistive technology.

History

Early history
The earliest evidence of using occupations as a method of therapy can be found in ancient times. In c. 100 BCE, Greek physician Asclepiades treated patients with a mental illness humanely using therapeutic baths, massage, exercise, and music. Later, the Roman Celsus prescribed music, travel, conversation and exercise to his patients. However, by medieval times the use of these interventions with people with mental illness was rare, if not nonexistent.

In 18th-century Europe, revolutionaries such as Philippe Pinel and Johann Christian Reil reformed the hospital system. Instead of the use of metal chains and restraints, their institutions used rigorous work and leisure activities in the late 18th century. This was the Moral Treatment era, developed in Europe during the Age of Enlightenment, where the roots of occupational therapy lie. Although it was thriving in Europe, interest in the reform movement fluctuated in the United States throughout the 19th century. It re-emerged in the early decades of the 20th century as Occupational Therapy.

The Arts and Crafts movement that took place between 1860 and 1910 also impacted occupational therapy. In the US, a recently industrialized country, the arts and crafts societies emerged against the monotony and lost autonomy of factory work. Arts and crafts were used to promote learning through doing, provided a creative outlet, and served as a way to avoid boredom during long hospital stays.

Eleanor Clarke Slagle (1870-1942) is considered to be the "mother" of occupational therapy.  Slagle, who was one of the founding members of the National Society for the Promotion of Occupational Therapy (NSPOT), proposed habit training as a primary occupational therapy model of treatment.  Based on the philosophy that engagement in meaningful routines shape a person's wellbeing, habit training focused on creating structure and balance between work, rest and leisure. Although habit training was initially developed to treat individuals with mental health conditions, its basic tenets are apparent in modern treatment models that are utilized across a wide scope of client populations.

In 1915 Slagle opened the first occupational therapy training program, the Henry B. Favill School of Occupations, at Hull House in Chicago. Slagle went on to serve as both AOTA president and secretary. In 1954, AOTA created the Eleanor Clarke Slagle Lectureship Award in her honor.  Each year, this award recognizes a member of AOTA "who has creatively contributed to the development of the body of knowledge of the profession through research, education, or clinical practice."

Development into a health profession in the United States of America

The health profession of occupational therapy was conceived in the early 1910s as a reflection of the Progressive Era. Early professionals merged highly valued ideals, such as having a strong work ethic and the importance of crafting with one's own hands with scientific and medical principles. The National Society for the Promotion of Occupational Therapy (NSPOT), now called the American Occupational Therapy Association (AOTA), was founded in 1917 and the profession of Occupational Therapy was officially named in 1921. William Rush Dunton, one of the founders of NSPOT and visionary figure in the first decades of the profession struggled with "the cumbersomeness of the term occupational therapy", as it lacked the "exactness of meaning which is possessed by scientific terms". Other titles such as "work-cure", "ergo therapy" (ergo being the Greek root for "work"), and "creative occupations" were discussed as substitutes, but ultimately, none possessed the broad meaning that the practice of occupational therapy demanded in order to capture the many forms of treatment that existed from the beginning.

The emergence of occupational therapy challenged the views of mainstream scientific medicine. Instead of focusing purely on the medical model, occupational therapists argued that a complex combination of social, economic, and biological reasons cause dysfunction. Principles and techniques were borrowed from many disciplines—including but not limited to physical therapy, nursing, psychiatry, rehabilitation, self-help, orthopedics, and social work—to enrich the profession's scope. Between 1900 and 1930, the founders defined the realm of practice and developed supporting theories. By the early 1930s, AOTA had established educational guidelines and accreditation procedures.

The early twentieth century was a time in which the rising incidence of disability related to industrial accidents, tuberculosis, World War I, and mental illness brought about an increasing social awareness of the issues involved. The entry of the United States into World War I was also a crucial event in the history of the profession. Up until this time, occupational therapy had been concerned primarily with the treatment of people with mental illness. However, U.S. involvement in the Great War and the escalating numbers of injured and disabled soldiers presented a daunting challenge to those in command. The military enlisted the assistance of NSPOT to recruit and train over 1,200 "reconstruction aides" to help with the rehabilitation of those wounded in the war. With entry into World War II and the ensuing skyrocketing demand for occupational therapists to treat those injured in the war, the field of occupational therapy underwent dramatic growth and change. Occupational therapists needed to be skilled not only in the use of constructive activities such as crafts, but also increasingly in the use of activities of daily living.

There was a struggle to keep people in the profession during the post-war years. Emphasis shifted from the altruistic war-time mentality to the financial, professional, and personal satisfaction that comes with being a therapist. To make the profession more appealing, practice was standardized, as was the curriculum. Entry and exit criteria were established, and the American Occupational Therapy Association advocated for steady employment, decent wages, and fair working conditions. Via these methods, occupational therapy sought and obtained medical legitimacy in the 1920s. The 1920s and 1930s were a time of establishing standards of education and laying the foundation of the profession and its organization. Eleanor Clarke Slagle proposed a 12-month course of training in 1922, and these standards were adopted in 1923. Educational standards were expanded to a total training time of 18 months in 1930 to place the requirements for professional entry on par with those of other professions. The first textbook was published in the United States for occupational therapy in 1947, edited by Helen S. Willard and Clare S. Spackman. The profession continued to grow and redefine itself in the 1950s. The profession also began to assess the potential for the use of trained assistants in the attempt to address the ongoing shortage of qualified therapists, and educational standards for occupational therapy assistants were implemented in 1960. The 1960s and 1970s were a time of ongoing change and growth for the profession as it struggled to incorporate new knowledge and cope with the recent and rapid growth of the profession in the previous decades. New developments in the areas of neurobehavioral research led to new conceptualizations and new treatment approaches, possibly the most groundbreaking being the sensory integrative approach developed by A. Jean Ayres.

The profession has continued to grow and expand its scope and settings of practice. Occupational science, the study of occupation, was founded in 1989 as an academic discipline to provide foundational research on occupation to support and advance the practice of occupation-based occupational therapy, as well as offer a basic science to study topics surrounding "occupation".

In addition, occupational therapy practitioner's roles have expanded to include political advocacy (from a grassroots base to higher legislation); for example, in 2010 PL 111-148 titled the Patient Protection and Affordable Care Act had a habilitation clause that was passed in large part due to AOTA's political efforts as noted in AOTA's Centennial website (AOTA, 2017).  Furthermore, occupational therapy practitioners have been striving personally and professionally toward concepts of occupational justice and other human rights issues that have both local and global impacts.  The World Federation of Occupational Therapist's Resource Centre has many position statements on occupational therapy's roles regarding their participation in human rights issues.

As of 2021, U.S. News & World Report ranked occupational therapy as #19 of their list of '100 Best Jobs'.

Philosophical underpinnings
The philosophy of occupational therapy has evolved over the history of the profession. The philosophy articulated by the founders owed much to the ideals of romanticism, pragmatism and humanism, which are collectively considered the fundamental ideologies of the past century.

One of the most widely cited early papers about the philosophy of occupational therapy was presented by Adolf Meyer, a psychiatrist who had emigrated to the United States from Switzerland in the late 19th century and who was invited to present his views to a gathering of the new Occupational Therapy Society in 1922. At the time, Dr. Meyer was one of the leading psychiatrists in the United States and head of the new psychiatry department and Phipps Clinic at Johns Hopkins University in Baltimore, Maryland.

William Rush Dunton, a supporter of the National Society for the Promotion of Occupational Therapy, now the American Occupational Therapy Association, sought to promote the ideas that occupation is a basic human need, and that occupation is therapeutic. From his statements came some of the basic assumptions of occupational therapy, which include:
 Occupation has a positive effect on health and well-being.
 Occupation creates structure and organizes time.
 Occupation brings meaning to life, culturally and personally.
 Occupations are individual. People value different occupations.

These assumptions have been developed over time and are the basis of the values that underpin the Codes of Ethics issued by the national associations. The relevance of occupation to health and well-being remains the central theme.

In the 1950s, criticism from medicine and the multitude of disabled World War II veterans resulted in the emergence of a more reductionistic philosophy. While this approach led to developments in technical knowledge about occupational performance, clinicians became increasingly disillusioned and re-considered these beliefs. As a result, client centeredness and occupation have re-emerged as dominant themes in the profession. Over the past century, the underlying philosophy of occupational therapy has evolved from being a diversion from illness, to treatment, to enablement through meaningful occupation.

Three commonly mentioned philosophical precepts of occupational therapy are that occupation is necessary for health, that its theories are based on holism and that its central components are people, their occupations (activities), and the environments in which those activities take place. However, there have been some dissenting voices. Mocellin, in particular, advocated abandoning the notion of health through occupation as he proclaimed it obsolete in the modern world. As well, he questioned the appropriateness of advocating holism when practice rarely supports it. Some values formulated by the American Occupational Therapy Association have been critiqued as being therapist-centric and do not reflect the modern reality of multicultural practice.

In recent times occupational therapy practitioners have challenged themselves to think more broadly about the potential scope of the profession, and expanded it to include working with groups experiencing occupational injustice stemming from sources other than disability. Examples of new and emerging practice areas would include therapists working with refugees, children experiencing obesity, and people experiencing homelessness.

Practice frameworks 
An occupational therapist works systematically with a client through a sequence of actions called the occupational therapy process. There are several versions of this process as described by numerous scholars. All practice frameworks include the components of evaluation (or assessment), intervention, and outcomes. This process provides a framework through which occupational therapists assist and contribute to promoting health and ensures structure and consistency among therapists.

The Occupational Therapy Practice Framework (OTPF) is the core competency of occupational therapy in the United States. The OTPF is divided into two sections: domain and process. The domain includes environment, client factors, such as the individual's motivation, health status, and status of performing occupational tasks. The domain looks at the contextual picture to help the occupational therapist understand how to diagnose and treat the patient. The process is the actions taken by the therapist to implement a plan and strategy to treat the patient.

The Canadian Model of Client Centered Enablement (CMCE) embraces occupational enablement as the core competency of occupational therapy and the Canadian Practice Process Framework (CPPF) as the core process of occupational enablement in Canada. The Canadian Practice Process Framework (CPPF) has eight action points and three contextual element which are: set the stage, evaluate, agree on objective plan, implement plan, monitor/modify, and evaluate outcome. A central element of this process model is the focus on identifying both client and therapists strengths and resources prior to developing the outcomes and action plan.

Occupations
According to the American Occupational Therapy Association's (AOTA) Occupational Therapy Practice Framework: Domain and Process, 4th Edition (OTPF-4), an occupation is defined as any type of meaningful activity in which one engages in order to "occupy" one's time. These occupations can be goal-directed, task-oriented, purposeful, culturally relevant, role specific, individually tailored, or community-oriented, depending on one's values, beliefs, context, and environment.
The following are examples of such occupations:
     Activities of daily living (ADLs)
 The OTPF-4 defines ADLs as daily activities that are required to take care of one's self and body, which are instrumental to one's health, well-being, and social participation.
   Examples of ADL's include: bathing, showering, toileting and toilet hygiene, dressing, swallowing/eating, feeding, functional mobility, personal hygiene and grooming, and sexual activity.
 Instrumental activities of daily living (IADLs)
 The OTPF-4 defines IADLs as daily activities that "support daily life within the home and community that often require more complex interactions than those used in ADLs".
   Examples of IADLs include: Care of others, Care of pets, Child rearing, Communication management, Driving and community mobility, Financial management, Health management and maintenance, Home establishment and managements, Meal preparation and cleanup, Medication management, Religious and spiritual activities and expression, Safety and emergency maintenance, Shopping.
 Rest and sleep
 The OTPF-4 defines rest and sleep as "activities related to obtaining restorative rest and sleep to support healthy, active engagement in other occupations".
   Examples of rest and sleep include: Rest, sleep preparation, and sleep participation.
 Education
 The OTPF-4 defines education as the activities that are needed to support one's learning, participation, and accessibility within an educational environment.
   Examples of education include: formal education participation, informal personal education needs or interests exploration (beyond formal education), and informal personal education participation.
 Work
 Employment interests and pursuits
 The OTPF-4 cites Mosey (1996, pg. 423) as how an individual selects work opportunities by their likes, dislikes, possible limitations, and assets.
 Employment seeking and acquisition
 The OTPF-4 defines this aspect of work as the opportunity for one to advocate for oneself along with completing, submitting, and reviewing application materials. The preparation involved for interviews, the act of participating in an interview, as well as following up after an interview. And lastly, the act of participating.
 Job performance
 The OTPF-4 defines this aspect of work as how an individual carries out their job. Examples given are: the way in which a person carries out their job requirements i.e. work skills, work patterns, time management, interactions and relationships with coworkers/managers/customers, supervision, production, initiation, etc.
 Retirement preparation and adjustment
 The OTPF-4 defines this aspect of work as how an individual adjusts to their new role that includes a vocational interests and opportunities. The opportunity for individuals to develop and enhance interests and skills.
 Volunteer exploration
 The OTPF-4 defines this aspect of work as the opportunity for an individual to discover community causes, organizations, or opportunities in which they can participate without pay that meets their personal interests, skills, location
 Play
 Play exploration
 The OTPF-4 defines this aspect of work as the opportunity for an individual to discover community causes, organizations, or opportunities in which they can participate without pay that meets their personal interests, skills, location
 Play participation
 The OTPF-4 defines this aspect of play as the individual's participation in the selected method of play. How an individual is able to balance play with their other occupations. This area also addresses how a person gathers the necessary components for play and uses the equipment appropriately.
 Leisure
 Leisure exploration
 The OTPF-4 identifies this aspect of leisure as the individual's identification of interests, skills, opportunities, and activities that are appropriate.
 Leisure participation
 The OTPF-4 identifies this aspect of leisure as the individuals activity in planning, and participating in leisure activities that are appropriate. The capacity to maintain a balance between leisure and other occupation as well as using the equipment necessary appropriately.
 Social participation
 Community
 The OTPF-4 defines this aspect of social participation as successful interaction through engagement in activities with a group (i.e. neighborhood, workplace, school, religious or spiritual group).
 Family
 The OTPF-4 cites Mosey (1996 p. 340) and defines this aspect of social participation as successful interaction within a familial role.
 Peer, friend
 The OTPF-4 defines this aspect of social participation as the distinctive levels of interaction and closeness which can include engagement in desired sexual activity.

Practice settings 

According to the 2015 Salary and Workforce Survey by the American Occupational Therapy Association, occupational therapists work in a wide-variety of practice settings including: hospitals (26.6%), schools (19.9%), long-term care facilities/skilled nursing facilities (19.2%), free-standing outpatient (10.7%), home health (6.8%), academia (6.1%), early intervention (4.6%), mental health (2.4%), community (2%), and other (15%). Recently, there is a trend of OTs moving towards working in the hospital setting and in the long-term care facilities/skilled nursing facilities setting, comprising 46% of the OT workforce.

The Canadian Institute for Health Information (CIHI) found that between 2006 and 2010 nearly half (45.6%) of occupational therapists worked in hospitals, 31.8% worked in the community, and 11.4% worked in a professional practice.

Areas of practice
The broad spectrum of OT practice makes it difficult to categorize the areas of practice, especially considering the differing health care systems globally. In this section, the categorization from the American Occupational Therapy Association is used.

Children and youth

Occupational therapists work with infants, toddlers, children, youth, and their families in a variety of settings, including schools, clinics, homes, hospitals, and the community. Assessment of a person's ability to engage in daily, meaningful occupations is the initial step of occupational therapy (OT) intervention and involves evaluating a young person's occupational performance in areas of feeding, playing, socializing, daily living skills, or attending school. Occupational therapists take into consideration the strengths and weaknesses of a child's underlying skills which may be physical, cognitive, or emotional in nature, as well as the context and environmental demands at play. In planning treatment, occupational therapists work in collaboration with parents, caregivers, teachers, or the children and teens themselves in order to develop functional goals within a variety of occupations meaningful to the young client. Early intervention is an extremely important aspect of the daily functioning of a child between the ages of birth-3 years old. This area of practice sets the tone or standard for therapy in the school setting. OT's who practice in early intervention develop a family's ability to care for their child with special needs and promote his or her function and participation in the most natural environment as possible. Each child is required to have an Individualized Family Service Plan (IFSP) that focuses on the family's goals for the child. It's possible for an OT to serve as the family's service coordinator and facilitate the team process for creating an IFSP for each eligible child.

Objectives that an occupational therapist addresses with children and youth may take a variety of forms. For example:
 Providing splinting and caregiver education in a hospital burn unit.
 Facilitating handwriting development through providing intervention to develop fine motor and writing readiness skills in school-aged children.
 Providing individualized treatment for sensory processing difficulties.
 Teaching coping skills to a child with generalized anxiety disorder.
 Consulting with teachers, counselors, social workers, parents/ caregivers, or any person that works with children  regarding modifications, accommodations and supports in a variety of areas, such as sensory processing, motor planning, visual processing, sequencing, transitions between schools, etc.
 Instructing caregivers in regard to mealtime intervention for children with autism who have feeding difficulties.

In the United States, pediatric occupational therapists work in the school setting as a "related service" for children with an Individual Education Plan (IEP). Every student who receives special education and related services in the public school system is required by law to have an IEP, which is a very individualized plan designed for each specific student (U.S. Department of Education, 2007). Related services are "developmental, corrective, and other supportive services as are required to assist a child with a disability to benefit from special education," and include a variety of professions  such as speech–language pathology and audiology services, interpreting services, psychological services, and physical and occupational therapy.

As a related service, occupational therapists work with children with varying disabilities to address those skills needed to access the special education program and support academic achievement and social participation throughout the school day (AOTA, n.d.-b). In doing so, occupational therapists help children fulfill their role as students and prepare them to transition to post-secondary education, career and community integration (AOTA, n.d.-b).

Occupational therapists have specific knowledge to increase participation in school routines throughout the day, including:
 Modification of the school environment to allow physical access for children with disabilities
 Provide assistive technology to support student success
 Helping to plan instructional activities for implementation in the classroom
 Support the needs of students with significant challenges such as helping to determine methods for alternate assessment of learning
 Helping students develop the skills necessary to transition to post-high school employment, independent living or further education (AOTA).

Other settings, such as homes, hospitals, and the community are important environments where occupational therapists work with children and teens to promote their independence in meaningful, daily activities. Outpatient clinics offer a growing OT intervention referred to as "Sensory Integration Treatment". This therapy, provided by experienced and knowledgeable pediatric occupational therapists, was originally developed by A. Jean Ayres, an occupational therapist. Sensory integration therapy is an evidence-based practice which enables children to better process and integrate sensory input from the child's body and from the environment, thus improving his or her emotional regulation, ability to learn, behavior, and functional participation in meaningful daily activities.

Recognition of occupational therapy programs and services for children and youth is increasing worldwide. Occupational therapy for both children and adults is now recognized by the United Nations as a human right which is linked to the social determinants of health. , there are over 500,000 occupational therapists working worldwide (many of whom work with children) and 778 academic institutions providing occupational therapy instruction.

Health and wellness
According to the American Occupational Therapy Association's (AOTA) Occupational Therapy Practice Framework, 3rd Edition, the domain of occupational therapy is described as "Achieving health, well-being, and participation in life through engagement in occupation".  Occupational therapy practitioners have a distinct value in their ability to utilize daily occupations to achieve optimal health and well-being.  By examining an individual's roles, routines, environment, and occupations, occupational therapists can identify the barriers in achieving overall health, well-being and participation.

Occupational therapy practitioners can intervene at primary, secondary and tertiary levels of intervention to promote health and wellness. It can be addressed in all practice settings to prevent disease and injuries, and adapt healthy lifestyle practices for those with chronic diseases. Two of the occupational therapy programs that have emerged targeting health and wellness are the Lifestyle Redesign Program and the REAL Diabetes Program.

Occupational therapy interventions for health and wellness vary in each setting:

School

Occupational therapy practitioners target school-wide advocacy for health and wellness including: bullying prevention, backpack awareness, recess promotion, school lunches, and PE inclusion. They also heavily work with students with learning disabilities such as those on the autism spectrum.

A study conducted in Switzerland showed that a large majority of occupational therapists collaborate with schools, half of them providing direct services within mainstream school settings. The results also show that services were mainly provided to children with medical diagnoses, focusing on the school environment rather than the child's disability.

Outpatient

Occupational therapy practitioners conduct 1:1 treatment sessions and group interventions to address: leisure, health literacy and education, modified physical activity, stress/anger management, healthy meal preparation, and medication management.

Acute care

Occupational therapy practitioners conduct 1:1 treatment sessions, group interventions and promote hospital-wide programs targeting: self-care activities, neurocognitive assessment and intervention, pain management techniques, physical activity and mobility, leisure, social engagement, stress management, diet and lifestyle recommendations, and medication management.

Community-based

Occupational therapy practitioners develop and implement community wide programs to assist in prevention of diseases and encourage healthy lifestyles by: conducting education classes for prevention, facilitating gardening, offering ergonomic assessments, and offering pleasurable leisure and physical activity programs.

Mental health

The occupational therapy profession believes that the health of an individual is fostered through active engagement in one's occupations (AOTA, 2014). When a person is experiencing any mental health need, his or her ability to actively participate in occupations may be hindered. For example, if a person has depression or anxiety, he or she may experience interruptions in sleep, difficulty completing self-care tasks, decreased motivation to participate in leisure activities, decreased concentration for school or job related work, and avoidance of social interactions. Occupational therapy practitioners possess the educational knowledge base in mental health and can contribute to the efforts in mental health promotion, prevention, and intervention. Occupational therapy practitioners can provide services that focus on social emotional well-being, prevention of negative behaviors, early detection through screenings, and intensive intervention (Bazyk & Downing, 2017). Occupational therapy practitioners can work directly with clients, provide professional development for staff, and work in collaboration with other team members and families. For instance, occupational therapists are specifically skilled at understanding the relationship between the demands of a task and the person's abilities. With this knowledge, practitioners are able to devise an intervention plan to facilitate successful participation in meaningful occupations. Occupational therapy services can focus on engagement in occupation to support participation in areas related to school, education, work, play, leisure, ADLs, and instrumental ADLs (Bazyk & Downing, 2017).

Occupational therapy utilizes the public health approach to mental health (WHO, 2001) which emphasizes the promotion of mental health as well as the prevention of, and intervention for, mental illness. This model highlights the distinct value of occupational therapists in mental health promotion, prevention, and intensive interventions across the lifespan (Miles et al., 2010). Below are the three major levels of service:

Tier 3: intensive interventions

Intensive interventions are provided for individuals with identified mental, emotional, or behavioral disorders that limit daily functioning, interpersonal relationships, feelings of emotional well-being, and the ability to cope with challenges in daily life. Occupational therapy practitioners are committed to the recovery model which focuses on enabling persons with mental health challenges through a client-centered process to live a meaningful life in the community and reach their potential (Champagne & Gray, 2011).

The focus of intensive interventions (direct–individual or group, consultation) is engagement in occupation to foster recovery or "reclaiming mental health" resulting in optimal levels of community participation, daily functioning, and quality of life; functional assessment and intervention (skills training, accommodations, compensatory strategies) (Brown, 2012); identification and implementation of healthy habits, rituals, and routines to support wellness.

Tier 2: targeted services

Targeted services are designed to prevent mental health problems in persons who are at risk of developing mental health challenges, such as those who have emotional experiences (e.g., trauma, abuse), situational stressors (e.g., physical disability, bullying, social isolation, obesity) or genetic factors (e.g., family history of mental illness). Occupational therapy practitioners are committed to early identification of and intervention for mental health challenges in all settings.

The focus of targeted services (small groups, consultation, accommodations, education) is engagement in occupations to promote mental health and diminish early symptoms; small, therapeutic groups (Olson, 2011); environmental modifications to enhance participation (e.g., create Sensory friendly classrooms, home, or work environments)

Tier 1: universal services

Universal services are provided to all individuals with or without mental health or behavioral problems, including those with disabilities and illnesses (Barry & Jenkins, 2007). Occupational therapy services focus on mental health promotion and prevention for all: encouraging participation in health-promoting occupations (e.g., enjoyable activities, healthy eating, exercise, adequate sleep); fostering self-regulation and coping strategies (e.g., mindfulness, yoga); promoting mental health literacy (e.g., knowing how to take care of one's mental health and what to do when experiencing symptoms associated with ill mental health). Occupational therapy practitioners develop universal programs and embed strategies to promote mental health and well-being in a variety of settings, from schools to the workplace.

The focus of universal services (individual, group, school-wide, employee/organizational level) is universal programs to help all individuals successfully participate in occupations that promote positive mental health (Bazyk, 2011); educational and coaching strategies with a wide range of relevant stakeholders focusing on mental health promotion and prevention; the development of coping strategies and resilience; environmental modifications and supports to foster participation in health-promoting occupations.

Productive aging
Occupational therapists work with older adults to maintain independence, participate in meaningful activities, and live fulfilling lives. Some examples of areas that occupational therapists address with older adults are driving, aging in place, low vision, and dementia or Alzheimer's disease (AD). When addressing driving, driver evaluations are administered to determine if drivers are safe behind the wheel. To enable independence of older adults at home, occupational therapists perform falls risk assessments, assess clients functioning in their homes, and recommend specific home modifications. When addressing low vision, occupational therapists modify tasks and the environment. While working with individuals with AD, occupational therapists focus on maintaining quality of life, ensuring safety, and promoting independence.

Geriatrics/productive aging
Occupational therapists address all aspects of aging from health promotion to treatment of various disease processes. The goal of occupational therapy for older adults is to ensure that older adults can maintain independence and reduce health care costs associated with hospitalization and institutionalization. In the community, occupational therapists can assess an older adults ability to drive and if they are safe to do so. If it is found that an individual is not safe to drive the occupational therapist can assist with finding alternate transit options. Occupational therapists also work with older adults in their home as part of home care. In the home, an occupational therapist can work on such things as fall prevention, maximizing independence with activities of daily living, ensuring safety and being able to stay in the home for as long as the person wants. An occupational therapist can also recommend home modifications to ensure safety in the home. Many older adults have chronic conditions such as diabetes, arthritis, and cardiopulmonary conditions. Occupational therapists can help manage these conditions by offering education on energy conservation strategies or coping strategies. Not only do occupational therapists work with older adults in their homes, they also work with older adults in hospitals, nursing homes and post-acute rehabilitation. In nursing homes, the role of the occupational therapist is to work with clients and caregivers on education for safe care, modifying the environment, positioning needs and enhancing IADL skills to name a few. In post-acute rehabilitation, occupational therapists work with clients to get them back home and to their prior level of function after a hospitalization for an illness or accident. Occupational therapists also play a unique role for those with dementia. The therapist may assist with modifying the environment to ensure safety as the disease progresses along with caregiver education to prevent burnout. Occupational therapists also play a role in palliative and hospice care. The goal at this stage of life is to ensure that the roles and occupations that the individual finds meaningful continue to be meaningful. If the person is no longer able to perform these activities, the occupational therapist can offer new ways to complete these tasks while taking into consideration the environment along with psychosocial and physical needs. Not only do occupational therapists work with older adults in traditional settings, they also work in senior centre's and ALFs.

Visual impairment
Visual impairment is one of the top 10 disabilities among American adults.  Occupational therapists work with other professions, such as optometrists, ophthalmologists, and certified low vision therapists, to maximize the independence of persons with a visual impairment by using their remaining vision as efficiently as possible. AOTA's promotional goal of "Living Life to Its Fullest" speaks to who people are and learning about what they want to do, particularly when promoting the participation in meaningful activities, regardless of a visual impairment.  Populations that may benefit from occupational therapy includes older adults, persons with traumatic brain injury, adults with potential to return to driving, and children with visual impairments.
Visual impairments addressed by occupational therapists may be characterized into two types including low vision or a neurological visual impairment.  An example of a neurological impairment is a cortical visual impairment (CVI) which is defined as "...abnormal or inefficient vision resulting from a problem or disorder affecting the parts of brain that provide sight". The following section will discuss the role of occupational therapy when working with the visually impaired.

Occupational therapy for older adults with low vision includes task analysis, environmental evaluation, and modification of tasks or the environment as needed.  Many occupational therapy practitioners work closely with optometrists and ophthalmologists to address visual deficits in acuity, visual field, and eye movement in people with traumatic brain injury, including providing education on compensatory strategies to complete daily tasks safely and efficiently.  Adults with a stable visual impairment may benefit from occupational therapy for the provision of a driving assessment and an evaluation of the potential to return to driving.  Lastly, occupational therapy practitioners enable children with visual impairments to complete self care tasks and participate in classroom activities using compensatory strategies.

Adult rehabilitation

Occupational therapists address the need for rehabilitation following an injury or impairment. When planning treatment, occupational therapists address the physical, cognitive, psychosocial, and environmental needs involved in adult populations across a variety of settings.

Occupational therapy in adult rehabilitation may take a variety of forms:
 Working with adults with autism at day rehabilitation programs to promote successful relationships and community participation through instruction on social skills
 Increasing the quality of life for an individual with cancer by engaging them in occupations that are meaningful, providing anxiety and stress reduction methods, and suggesting fatigue management strategies
 Coaching individuals with hand amputations how to put on and take off a myoelectrically controlled limb as well as training for functional use of the limb
 Pressure sore prevention for those with sensation loss such as in spinal cord injuries.
 Using and implementing new technology such as speech to text software and Nintendo Wii video games
 Communicating via telehealth methods as a service delivery model for clients who live in rural areas
 Working with adults who have had a stroke to regain their activities of daily living

Assistive technology
Occupational therapy practitioners, or occupational therapists (OTs), are uniquely poised to educate, recommend, and promote the use of assistive technology to improve the quality of life for their clients. OTs are able to understand the unique needs of the individual in regards to occupational performance and have a strong background in activity analysis to focus on helping clients achieve goals. Thus, the use of varied and diverse assistive technology is strongly supported within occupational therapy practice models.

Travel occupational therapy
Because of the rising need for occupational therapy practitioners in the U.S., many facilities are opting for travel occupational therapy practitioners—who are willing to travel, often out of state, to work temporarily in a facility. Assignments can range from 8 weeks to 9 months, but typically last 13–26 weeks in length. Travel therapists work in many different settings, but the highest need for therapists are in home health and skilled nursing facility settings. There are no further educational requirements needed to be a travel occupational therapy practitioner; however, there may be different state licensure guidelines and practice acts that must be followed. According to Zip Recruiter, the national average salary for a full-time travel therapist is $86,475 with a range between $62,500 to $100,000 across the United States. Most commonly (43%), travel occupational therapists enter the industry between the ages of 21–30.

Occupational justice

The practice area of occupational justice relates to the "benefits, privileges and harms associated with participation in occupations" and the effects related to access or denial of opportunities to participate in occupations. This theory brings attention to the relationship between occupations, health, well-being, and quality of life. Occupational justice can be approached individually and collectively. The individual path includes disease, disability, and functional restrictions. The collective way consists of public health, gender and sexual identity, social inclusion, migration, and environment. The skills of occupational therapy practitioners enable them to serve as advocates for systemic change, impacting institutions, policy, individuals, communities, and entire populations. Examples of populations that experience occupational injustice include refugees, prisoners, homeless persons, survivors of natural disasters, individuals at the end of their life, people with disabilities, elderly living in residential homes, individuals experiencing poverty, children, immigrants, and LGBTQI+ individuals.

For example, the role of an occupational therapist working to promote occupational justice may include:
 Analyzing task, modifying activities and environments to minimize barriers to participation in meaningful activities of daily living.
 Addressing physical and mental aspects that may hinder a person's functional ability.
 Provide intervention that is relevant to the client, family, and social context.
 Contribute to global health by advocating for individuals with disabilities to participate in meaningful activities on a global level. Occupation therapists are involved with the World Health Organization (WHO), non-governmental organizations and community groups and policymaking to influence the health and well-being of individuals with disabilities worldwide

Occupational therapy practitioners' role in occupational justice is not only to align with perceptions of procedural and social justice but to advocate for the inherent need of meaningful occupation and how it promotes a just society, well-being, and quality of life among people relevant to their context. It is recommended to the clinicians to consider occupational justice in their everyday practice to promote the intention of helping people participate in tasks that they want and need to do.

Occupational injustice
In contrast, occupational injustice relates to conditions wherein people are deprived, excluded or denied of opportunities that are meaningful to them. Types of occupational injustices and examples within the OT practice include:

Occupational deprivation: The exclusion from meaningful occupations due to external factors that are beyond the person's control. For example, a person with difficulties with functional mobility may find it challenging to reintegrate into the community due to transportation barriers.

•	OTs can help in raising awareness and bringing communities together to reduce occupational deprivation

•	OTs can recommend the removal of environmental barriers to facilitate occupation, whilst designing programs that enable engagement.

•	Advocacy by providing information to policy to prevent possible unintended occupational deprivation and increase social cohesion and inclusion

Occupational apartheid: The exclusion of a person in chosen occupations due to personal characteristics such as age, gender, race, nationality, or socioeconomic status. An example can be seen in children with developmental disabilities from low socioeconomic backgrounds whose families would opt out of therapy due to financial constraints.

•	OTs providing interventions within a segregated population must focus on increasing occupational engagement through large-scale environmental modification and occupational exploration.

•	OTs can address occupational engagement through group and individual skill-building opportunities, as well as community-based experiences that explore free and local resources

Occupational marginalization: Relates to how implicit norms of behavior or societal expectations prevent a person from engaging in a chosen occupation. As an example, a child with physical impairments may only be offered table-top leisure activities instead of sports as an extracurricular activity due to the functional limitations caused by his physical impairments.

•	OTs can design, develop, and/or provide programs that mitigate the negative impacts of occupational marginalization and enhance optimal levels of performance and wellbeing that enable participation

Occupational imbalance: The limited participation in a meaningful occupation brought about by another role in a different occupation. This can be seen in the situation of a caregiver of a person with a disability who also has to fulfill other roles such as being a parent to other children, a student, or a worker.

•	OTs can advocate fostering for supportive environments for participation in occupations that promote individuals' well-being and in advocating for building healthy public policy

Occupational alienation: The imposition of an occupation that does not hold meaning for that person. In the OT profession, this manifests in the provision of rote activities that do not really relate to the goals or the client's interests.

•	OTs can develop individualized activities tailored to the interests of the individual to maximize their potential.
•	OTs can design, develop and promote programs that can be inclusive and provide a variety of choices that the individual can engage in.

Within occupational therapy practice, injustice may ensue in situations wherein professional dominance, standardized treatments, laws and political conditions create a negative impact on the occupational engagement of our clients. Awareness of these injustices will enable the therapist to reflect on his own practice and think of ways in approaching their client's problems while promoting occupational justice.

Community-based therapy

As occupational therapy (OT) has grown and developed, community-based practice has blossomed from an emerging area of practice to a fundamental part of occupational therapy practice (Scaffa & Reitz, 2013). Community-based practice allows for OTs to work with clients and other stakeholders such as families, schools, employers, agencies, service providers, stores, day treatment and day care and others who may influence the degree of success the client will have in participating.  It also allows the therapist to see what is actually happening in the context and design interventions relevant to what might support the client in participating and what is impeding her or him from participating.  Community-based practice crosses all of the categories within which OTs practice from physical to cognitive, mental health to spiritual, all types of clients may be seen in community-based settings.  The role of the OT also may vary, from advocate to consultant, direct care provider to program designer, adjunctive services to therapeutic leader.

Education 
Worldwide, there is a range of qualifications required to practice as an occupational therapist or occupational therapy assistant. Depending on the country and expected level of practice, degree options include associate degree, Bachelor's degree, entry-level master's degree, post-professional master's degree, entry-level Doctorate (OTD), post-professional Doctorate (DrOT or OTD), Doctor of Clinical Science in OT (CScD), Doctor of Philosophy in Occupational Therapy (PhD), and combined OTD/PhD degrees.

Both occupational therapist and occupational therapy assistant roles exist internationally. Currently in the United States, dual points of entry exist for both OT and OTA programs. For OT, that is entry-level Master's or entry-level Doctorate. For OTA, that is associate degree or bachelor's degree.

The World Federation of Occupational Therapists (WFOT) has minimum standards for the education of OTs, which was revised in 2016. All of the educational programs around the world need to meet these minimum standards. These standards are subsumed by and can be supplemented with academic standards set by a country's national accreditation organization.  As part of the minimum standards, all programs must have a curriculum that includes practice placements (fieldwork). Examples of fieldwork settings include: acute care, inpatient hospital, outpatient hospital, skilled nursing facilities, schools, group homes, early intervention, home health, and community settings.

The profession of occupational therapy is based on a wide theoretical and evidence based background. The OT curriculum focuses on the theoretical basis of occupation through multiple facets of science, including occupational science, anatomy, physiology, biomechanics, and neurology. In addition, this scientific foundation is integrated with knowledge from psychology, sociology and more.

In the United States, Canada, and other countries around the world, there is a licensure requirement. In order to obtain an OT or OTA license, one must graduate from an accredited program, complete fieldwork requirements, and pass a national certification examination.

Theoretical frameworks
A distinguishing facet of occupational therapy is that therapists often espouse the use theoretical frameworks to frame their practice. Many have argued that the use of theory complicates everyday clinical care and is not necessary to provide patient-driven care.

Note that terminology differs between scholars. An incomplete list of theoretical bases for framing a human and their occupations include the following:

Generic models
Generic models are the overarching title given to a collation of compatible knowledge, research and theories that form conceptual practice. More generally they are defined as "those aspects which influence our perceptions, decisions and practice".
 The Person Environment Occupation Performance model (PEOP) was originally published in 1991 (Charles Christiansen & M. Carolyn Baum) and describes an individual's performance based on four elements including: environment, person, performance and occupation. The model focuses on the interplay of these components and how this interaction works to inhibit or promote successful engagement in occupation.
Occupation-focused practice models
 Occupational Therapy Intervention Process Model (OTIPM) (Anne Fisher and others)
 Occupational Performance Process Model (OPPM)
 Model of Human Occupation (MOHO) (Gary Kielhofner and others)
 MOHO was first published in 1980. It explains how people select, organise and undertake occupations within their environment. The model is supported with evidence generated over thirty years and has been successfully applied throughout the world.
 Canadian Model of Occupational Performance and Engagement (CMOP-E)
 Occupational Performances Model – Australia (OPM-A) (Chris Chapparo & Judy Ranka)
 The OPM(A) was conceptualized in 1986 with its current form launched in 2006. The OPM(A) illustrates the complexity of occupational performance, the scope of occupational therapy practice, and provides a framework for occupational therapy education.
 Kawa (River) Model (Michael Iwama)
 Biopsychosocial models
 Engel's biopsychosocial model takes into account how disease and illness can be impacted by social, environmental, psychological and body functions. The biopsychosocial model is unique in that it takes the client's subjective experience and the client-provider relationship as factors to wellness.  This model also factors in cultural diversity as many countries have different societal norms and beliefs. This is a multifactorial and multi-dimensional model to understand not only the cause of disease but also a person-centered approach that the provider has more of a participatory and reflective role.
 Other models which incorporate biology (body and brain), psychology (mind), and social (relational, attachment) elements influencing human health include interpersonal neurobiology (IPNB), polyvagal theory (PVT), and the dynamic-maturational model of attachment and adaptation (DMM). The latter two in particular provide detail about the source, mechanism and function of somatic symptoms. Kasia Kozlowska describes how she uses these models to better connect with clients, to understand complex human illness, and how she includes occupational therapists as part of a team to address functional somatic symptoms. Her research indicates children with functional neurological disorders (FND) utilize higher, or more challenging, DMM self-protective attachment strategies to cope with their family environments, and how those impact functional somatic symptoms.
 Pamela Meredith and colleagues have been exploring the relationship between the attachment system and psychological and neurobiological systems with implications for how occupational therapists can improve their approach and techniques. They have found correlations between attachment and adult sensory processing, distress, and pain perception. In a literature review, Meredith identified a number of ways that occupational therapists can effectively apply an attachment perspective, sometimes uniquely.

Frames of reference
Frames of reference are an additional knowledge base for the occupational therapist to develop their treatment or assessment of a patient or client group. Though there are conceptual models (listed above) that allow the therapist to conceptualise the occupational roles of the patient, it is often important to use further reference to embed clinical reasoning. Therefore, many occupational therapists will use additional frames of reference to both assess and then develop therapy goals for their patients or service users.
 Biomechanical frame of reference
 The biomechanical frame of reference is primarily concerned with motion during occupation. It is used with individuals who experience limitations in movement, inadequate muscle strength or loss of endurance in occupations. The frame of reference was not originally compiled by occupational therapists, and therapists should translate it to the occupational therapy perspective, to avoid the risk of movement or exercise becoming the main focus.
 Rehabilitative (compensatory)
 Neurofunctional (Gordon Muir Giles and Clark-Wilson)
 Dynamic systems theory
 Client-centered frame of reference
 This frame of reference is developed from the work of Carl Rogers. It views the client as the center of all therapeutic activity, and the client's needs and goals direct the delivery of the occupational therapy process.
 Cognitive-behavioural frame of reference
 Ecology of human performance model
 The recovery model
 Sensory integration
 Sensory integration framework is commonly implemented in clinical, community, and school-based occupational therapy practice.  It is most frequently used with children with developmental delays and developmental disabilities such as autism spectrum disorder, Sensory processing disorder and dyspraxia.  Core features of sensory integration in treatment include providing opportunities for the client to experience and integrate feedback using multiple sensory systems, providing therapeutic challenges to the client's skills, integrating the client's interests into therapy, organizing of the environment to support the client's engagement, facilitating a physically safe and emotionally supportive environment, modifying activities to support the client's strengths and weaknesses, and creating sensory opportunities within the context of play to develop intrinsic motivation.  While sensory integration is traditionally implemented in pediatric practice, there is emerging evidence for the benefits of sensory integration strategies for adults.

ICF
The International Classification of Functioning, Disability and Health (ICF) is a framework to measure health and ability by illustrating how these components impact one's function. This relates very closely to the Occupational Therapy Practice Framework, as it is stated that "the profession's core beliefs are in the positive relationship between occupation and health and its view of people as occupational beings". The ICF is built into the 2nd edition of the practice framework. Activities and participation examples from the ICF overlap Areas of Occupation, Performance Skills, and Performance Patterns in the framework. The ICF also includes contextual factors (environmental and personal factors) that relate to the framework's context. In addition, body functions and structures classified within the ICF help describe the client factors described in the Occupational Therapy Practice Framework. Further exploration of the relationship between occupational therapy and the components of the ICIDH-2 (revision of the original International Classification of Impairments, Disabilities, and Handicaps (ICIDH), which later became the ICF) was conducted by McLaughlin Gray.

It is noted in the literature that occupational therapists should use specific occupational therapy vocabulary along with the ICF in order to ensure correct communication about specific concepts. The ICF might lack certain categories to describe what occupational therapists need to communicate to clients and colleagues. It also may not be possible to exactly match the connotations of the ICF categories to occupational therapy terms. The ICF is not an assessment and specialized occupational therapy terminology should not be replaced with ICF terminology. The ICF is an overarching framework for current therapy practices.

Global occupational therapy 
Occupational therapy is practiced around the world and can be translated in practice to many different cultures and environments.  The construct of occupation is shared throughout the profession regardless of country, culture and context. Occupation and the active participation in occupation is now seen as a human right and is asserted as a strong influence in health and well-being.

As the profession grows there is a lot of people who are travelling across countries to work as occupational therapists for better work or opportunities. Under this context, every occupational therapist is required to adapt to a new culture, foreign to their own. Understanding cultures and its communities are crucial to occupational therapy ethos. Effective occupational therapy practice includes acknowledging the values and social perspectives of each client and their families. Harnessing culture and understanding what is important to the client is truly a faster way towards independence.

The World Federation of Occupational Therapists is an international voice of the profession and is a membership network of occupational therapists worldwide.  WFOT supports the international practice of occupational therapy through collaboration across countries.  WFOT currently includes over 100 member country organizations, 550,000 occupational therapy practitioners, and 900 approved educational programs.

The profession celebrates World Occupational Therapy Day on the 27th of October annually to increase visibility and awareness of the profession, promoting the profession's development work at a local, national and international platform. WFOT has been in close collaboration with the World Health Organization (WHO) since 1959, working together in programmes that aim to improve world health. WFOT supports the vision for healthy people, in alignment with the United Nations 17 Sustainable Development Goals, which focuses on "ending poverty, fighting inequality and injustice, tackling climate change and promoting health". Occupational therapy is a major player in enabling individuals and communities to engage in "chosen and necessary occupations" and in "the creation of more meaningful lives".

See also 
 Occupational apartheid
 Occupational therapy in the United Kingdom
 Occupational therapy in the management of cerebral palsy
 Occupational therapy and substance use disorder

References

External links 
 
 World Federation of Occupational Therapists